In Greek mythology Nestor of Gerenia (Nestōr Gerēnios) was a legendary king of Pylos. He is a prominent secondary character in Homer's Iliad and Odyssey, where he appears as an elderly warrior who frequently offers long-winded advice to the other characters.

The Mycenaean-era palace at Pylos is known as the Palace of Nestor, though there is no evidence that he was an actual person.

Description 
In the account of Dares the Phrygian, Nestor was illustrated as ". . . large, broad and fair. His nose was long and hooked. He was a wise adviser."

Family 
Nestor was the son of King Neleus of Pylos and Chloris, daughter of King Amphion of Orchomenus. Otherwise, Nestor's mother was called Polymede.

His wife was either Eurydice or Anaxibia; their children included Peisistratus, Thrasymedes, Pisidice, Polycaste, Perseus, Stratichus, Aretus, Echephron, and Antilochus. In late accounts, Nestor had a daughter Epicaste who became the mother of Homer by Telemachus.

Mythology

Adventures 
Originally from Gerenia, Nestor was an Argonaut, helped to fight the centaurs, and also participated in the hunt for the Calydonian Boar. He became the King of Pylos after Heracles killed Neleus and all of Nestor's brothers. He was said to have lived three generations by favour of Apollo: the years which the god had taken from Chloris and her brothers, he granted to Nestor.

He and his sons, Antilochus and Thrasymedes, fought on the side of the Achaeans in the Trojan War. Though Nestor was already very old when the war began, he was noted for his bravery and speaking abilities. In the Iliad, he often gives advice to the younger warriors and advises Agamemnon and Achilles to reconcile. He is too old to engage in combat himself, but he leads the Pylian troops, riding his chariot, and one of his horses is killed by an arrow shot by Paris. He also had a solid gold shield. Homer frequently calls him by the epithet "the Gerenian horseman." At the funeral games of Patroclus, Nestor advises Antilochus on how to win the chariot race. Antilochus was later killed in battle by Memnon.

In the Odyssey, Nestor and those who were part of his army had safely returned to Pylos, having chosen to leave Troy immediately after plundering the city rather than staying behind with Agamemnon to appease Athena, who was angered by the heinous actions of some of the Greeks (probably Ajax the Lesser). Odysseus's son Telemachus travels to Pylos to inquire about the fate of his father. Nestor receives his friend's son, Telemachus, kindly and entertains him lavishly but is unable to furnish any information on his father's fate. Also appearing in the Odyssey are Nestor's wife Eurydice and their remaining living sons: Echephron, Stratius, Aretus, Thrasymedes and Peisistratus. Nestor also had two daughters named Pisidice and Polycaste.

Advice
Nestor's advice in the Iliad, while always respected by his listeners due to his age and experience, is always tempered with a sub-text of humor at his expense due to his boastfulness, as he is never able to dispense the advice without first spending several paragraphs recounting his own heroic actions in the past when faced with similar circumstances.

In the Odyssey, too, Homer's admiration of Nestor is tempered by some humor at his expense: Telemachus, having returned to Nestor's home from a visit to Helen of Troy and Menelaus (where he has sought further information on his father's fate), urges Peisistratus to let him board his vessel immediately to return home rather than being subjected to a further dose of Nestor's rather overwhelming sense of hospitality.  Peisistratus readily agrees, although ruefully stating that his father is bound to be furious when he learns of Telemachus's departure.

Nestor's advice in the Iliad has also been interpreted to have sinister undertones.  For example, when Patroclus comes to Nestor for advice in Book 11, Nestor persuades him that it is urgent for him to disguise himself as Achilles. Karl Reinhardt argues that this is contrary to what Patroclus really originally wanted—in fact, he is only there to receive information on behalf of Achilles about the wounded Machaon.  Reinhardt notes that an "unimportant errand left behind by an all-important one ... Patroclus' role as messenger is crucial and an ironic purpose permeates the encounter."

Homer offers contradictory portrayals of Nestor as a source of advice. On one hand, Homer describes him as a wise man; Nestor repeatedly offers advice to the Achaeans that has been claimed to be anachronistic in Homer's time—for example, arranging the armies by tribes and clans or effectively using chariots in battle. Yet at the same time Nestor's advice is frequently ineffective. Some examples include Nestor accepting without question the dream Zeus plants in Agamemnon in Book 2 and urging the Achaeans to battle, instructing the Achaeans in Book 4 to use spear techniques that in actuality would be disastrous, and in Book 11 giving advice to Patroclus that ultimately leads to his death.  Yet Nestor is never questioned and instead is frequently praised.

Hanna Roisman explains that the characters in the Iliad ignore the discrepancy between the quality of Nestor's advice and its outcomes because, in the world of the Iliad, "outcomes are ultimately in the hands of the ever arbitrary and fickle gods ... heroes are not necessarily viewed as responsible when things go awry."  In the Iliad, people are judged not necessarily in the modern view of results, but as people.  Therefore, Nestor should be viewed as a good counselor because of the qualities he possesses as described in his introduction in Book 1—as a man of "sweet words," a "clear-voiced orator," and whose voice "flows sweeter than honey." These are elements that make up Nestor, and they parallel the elements that Homer describes as part of a good counselor at Iliad 3.150–152.  Therefore, "the definition tells us that Nestor, as a good advisor, possesses the three features ... that it designates." Nestor is a good counselor inherently, and the consequences of his advice have no bearing on that, a view that differs from how good counselors are viewed today.

See also
 Nestor's Cup

Notes

References
 Apollodorus, The Library with an English Translation by Sir James George Frazer, F.B.A., F.R.S. in 2 Volumes, Cambridge, MA, Harvard University Press; London, William Heinemann Ltd. 1921. . Online version at the Perseus Digital Library. Greek text available from the same website.
Gaius Julius Hyginus, Fabulae from The Myths of Hyginus translated and edited by Mary Grant. University of Kansas Publications in Humanistic Studies. Online version at the Topos Text Project.
Homer, The Iliad with an English Translation by A.T. Murray, Ph.D. in two volumes. Cambridge, MA., Harvard University Press; London, William Heinemann, Ltd. 1924. Online version at the Perseus Digital Library.
 Homer, Homeri Opera in five volumes. Oxford, Oxford University Press. 1920. Greek text available at the Perseus Digital Library.
 Homer, The Odyssey with an English Translation by A.T. Murray, Ph.D. in two volumes. Cambridge, MA., Harvard University Press; London, William Heinemann, Ltd. 1919. Online version at the Perseus Digital Library. Greek text available from the same website.
Tzetzes, John, Allegories of the Iliad translated by Goldwyn, Adam J. and Kokkini, Dimitra. Dumbarton Oaks Medieval Library, Harvard University Press, 2015.

Further reading

Douglas Frame 2009: Hippota Nestor: Washington, DC: Center for Hellenic Studies 
Douglas Frame 1978: The Myth of Return in Early Greek Epic, New Haven: Yale University Press.
Keith Dickson 1995: Nestor: Poetic Memory in Greek Epic: NY: Garland Publishers.
Keith Dickson 1993: "Nestor Among the Sirens," Oral Tradition 8/1: 21–58. 
Richard R. Martin 2012: Review of Douglas Frame Hippota Nestor 2009 in American Journal of Philology (AJP) 133.4 (Winter 2012): 687-692
Hanna Roisman 2005: "Nestor the Good Counselor," Classical Quarterly 55: 17-38 
Victoria Pedrick 1983: :The Paradignatic Nature of Nestor's Speech,: Transactions and Proceedings of the American Philological Assn. (TAPA) 113: 55–68.
R.M. Frazer 1971: “Nestor’s Generations, Iliad 2.250-2” Glotta 49:216-8; 
V.C. Mathews 1987: “Kaukonian Dyme: Antimachus fr.27-8 and the text of Homer,” Eranos 85: 91–7.
Jack L. Davis (ed) 1998: Sandy Pylos: An Archaeological History from Nestor to Navarino. Austin: University of Texas Press. 
William G. Loy 1970: Land of Nestor: A Physical Geography of the Southwest Peloponnesos: Washington, DC. National Academy of Sciences. 
Carl Blegen and Marion Rawson (ed) 1966: Palace of Nestor at Pylos in Western Messenia for University of Cincinnati by Princeton University Press.

 
Neleides
Argonauts
Achaean Leaders
Princes in Greek mythology
Kings of Pylos
Kings in Greek mythology
Characters in the Odyssey
Pylian characters in Greek mythology
Deeds of Apollo
Mythology of Heracles
Longevity myths